Kuntu Repertory Theatre was a primarily student-based, African-American repertory theatre in Pittsburgh, Pennsylvania, United States.

Dr. Vernell A. Lillie founded it in 1974 at the University of Pittsburgh as a way of showcasing the playwright Rob Penny. The next year Penny's friend, August Wilson, brought his play Homecoming to Kuntu; it was his first play to be produced by a resident company. The theater group remained part of the University of Pittsburgh's Department of Africana Studies through the 2010-2011 season when Lillie retired as a professor at Pitt.

Wilson, Penny, and poet Maisha Baton also started the Kuntu Writers Workshop to bring African-American writers together in discussion and to assist them in publication and production.

The Kuntu Repertory Theatre has won multiple awards, including several Onyx and People's Choice awards from the African American Council of Theatre  The company has also participated in the Pittsburgh New Works Festival.

Kuntu's primary venues when based at the University of Pittsburgh were the Stephen Foster Memorial, and later, through the 2010-11 season, the seventh-floor auditorium of the university's Alumni Hall. In 2011 Kuntu moved to a new home at the Carnegie Library of Pittsburgh's Homewood branch. Due to funding difficulties, the Kuntu Repertory Theatre announced it was closing after the 2012-2013 season.

Alumni
Esther Rolle
Glynn Turman
Mark Southers
Rob Penny
Sala Udin
Montae Russell

See also
Theatre in Pittsburgh

References

External links
  Kuntu Repertory Theatre Page in PITTARTS Directory via Internet Archive Wayback Machine 
 Kuntu Repertory Theatre, 1975-2013 (1.0 box), Ford E. and Harriet R. Curtis Theatre Collection of Pittsburgh Theatre Programs, 1840- , CTC.1966.01, Curtis Theatre Collection, Special Collections Department, University of Pittsburgh
 Kuntu Repertory Theatre via Internet Archive Wayback Machine

African-American theatre companies
African Americans in Pennsylvania
Theatre companies in Pittsburgh
Arts organizations established in 1974